The Canadian federal budget for fiscal year 1989–1990 was presented to the House of Commons of Canada by finance minister Michael Wilson on 27 April 1989. It was the first budget after the 1988 Canadian federal election.

The budget set the stage for a plan to eliminate the deficit within three years. It would do so through spending cuts and raising taxes.

Background 

In the November 1988 election campaign, the issue of the debt and the deficit was seldom raised. However, in February 1989, International Moneratary Fund had publicly warned the Canadian government that its Canadian national debt had gone out of control, and that radical measures were needed to curb the deficit. At the time, it totaled 320 Billion dollars, and was the highest among all industrialized countries except Italy.

In the months prior to the presentation of the budget, the government often bought up the subject of the debt and the deficit in public appearances, making the case that it was putting the Canadian economy in great danger. These efforts were fruitful. According to gallup polling data from March 1989, the deficit was second in the list of the people's major concerns, with 18% saying it was the issue that required the greatest attention, behind the environment at 28%. In January 1989, that number was 10%, and 4% during the last election cycle.

Leak 
On April 26, 1989, parts of the budget were leaked to the press. Global TV Parliament Hill bureau chief Doug Small read the highlights of the budget on air. He had received the documents that afternoon from John Appleby, a Department of National Defence clerk (whose friend worked at the recycling plant where it was found). This forced minister Wilson to call a press conference at 5:30 PM that day, where he improvised the early release of the budget.

Brian Mulroney called the leak a criminal act, and charged Small, Appleby, the recycling plant worker and 2 others of possession of stolen property. Charges against Small were eventually thrown out the following year.

Key elements 

The main provisions of the budget are measures with the objective to reduce the deficit. These include spending cuts and tax increases.

Cuts 
Via Rail's subsidy was be cut by 500 million dollars, as were the subsidies of numerous other crown corporations and agencies. Air Canada was fully privatized, as the 55% of shares the government still held were planned to be sold.

The 8-billion dollar nuclear submarine program has been scrapped, and the military was planned to suffer spending cuts amounting 2.7-billion dollars over five years.

The budget for Official Development Assistance (i.e. international aid) would be cut by $360 million in 1989-90 (the program's growth rate would be capped at 5% in the 1990 federal budget).

Federal day-care commitments were also cut, as were many other provincial transfers.

Tax measures 
The budget raised 9 billion dollars in new taxes.

Personal income taxes 
 Clawback of OAS and Family allowance: The budget planned on taxing back old age security and family allowance benefits from people with net income of $50,000 or more. This measure chips away the universality of these programs;
 Increase of the federal surtax: on July 1, 1989, the 3% surtax on personal incomes would raise to 5%;
 Creation of an additional surtax for high-income taxpayers: on July 1, 1989, an additional 3% surtax is introduced on basic federal tax in excess of $15,000. That surtax affects taxpayers earning over $70,000 per year;
 The tax rate of income not attributed to a province is increased from 47% to 52% of basic federal tax starting on July 1, 1989. Minor increase in tax revenues is expected from that change.

Corporate taxes 
 Introduction of a Large Corporations Tax: a new tax is levied on large corporation at a rate of 0.175% of taxable capital employed in Canada in excess of $10 million (that $10 million exemption is shared among related corporation). That new tax is very similar to provincial taxes on capital. It is not a deductible charge for the federal corporate income tax but is creditable against the 3% federal surtax. The government projected this tax would yield revenues of $965 million in 1989-90.

Goods and services tax 
The budget announced the introduction of the Federal Goods and Services Tax, which planned to be effective on January 1, 1991. It was initially planned to be set at 9%.

Excise taxes 
Pending the introduction of the Goods and services tax, the government introduced changes to existing sales and excise taxes:
 Increase of excise taxes: The federal Tax on liquor rose by 1%, as did the tax on telecommunication services and construction materials;
 Increase of Refundable Sales Tax Credit: the tax credits was increased from $70 to $100 per adult in 1989 and $140 in 1990;
 Increase of gasoline tax: The price of gasoline rose by 1 cent per litre.

Reactions

Opposition 
The Liberal Party and the New Democratic Party (NDP) were both vehemently opposed to the budget. On the day the budget was leaked, NDP leader Ed Broadbent called on finance minister Michael Wilson to resign.

Unions 
Almost every Canadian labour unions reacted very negatively to the budget, criticizing its tax increases and its lack of job-creating measures. Shirley Carr, president of the Canadian Labour Congress (CTC), said that the budget was  "an economic aggression that is not necessary. It is a cruel and brutal that will come to symbolize the free trade agreement". The CTC and 80 affiliated labour unions launched a nationwide campaign to have most of the budget's measures undone.

Provinces 
Every single provincial governments was opposed to the budget. As per example, Manitoba's PC premier Gary Filmon said he was "extremely disappointed" by the budget. Both him and Quebec premier Robert Bourassa called on other provinces to oppose the budget, which he saw as a ploy to transfer the federal government's financial burden on to the provinces.

Provinces were especially introduction of a federal sales tax. Shortly after the budget was presented, Bourassa and Ontario premier David Peterson called for its introduction to be cancelled. They were subsequently joined in this effort by British Columbia premier Bill Vander Zalm and Newfoundland and Labrador premier Clyde Wells. The former had previously claimed the budget was "worse than expected".

Parti Québécois leader and Leader of the Opposition in the National Assembly of Quebec Jacques Parizeau called for Quebec to patriate Employment Insurance from Canada in reaction to the cuts proposed to the program in the budget.

External links 

 Budget Speech
 Budget Papers

References

Canadian budgets
1989 in Canadian law
1989 government budgets
1989 in Canadian politics